William Jebor (born 10 November 1991) is a Liberian professional footballer who plays as a striker for Maltese Premier League side Valletta and the Liberia national team, formerly serving as captain of the side.

He is the second Liberian to be an Africa Footballer of the Year nominee, after George Weah, who won the prestigious award three times.

Club career
Born in Monrovia, Jebor made his senior debut with LPRC Oilers in 2008, aged 17, after previously representing LISCR FC as a youth. In the summer of 2009, he moved abroad for the first time in his career, signing for Syrian Premier League side Taliya SC.

In 2010, Jebor switched teams and countries again, joining Egyptian Second Division club Tersana SC. After a short spell at Eastern Company, he moved to Tala'ea El Gaish in the Egyptian Premier League.

Jebor made his debut for the club on 3 February 2013, starting in a 1–0 away loss against Ismaily SC, and scored his first goal for the club on 12 March, netting the first in a 2–1 home win against El Mokawloon SC. He finished the campaign with ten goals, being tournament's topscorer; highlights included a hat-trick in a 3–2 home success over Ittihad El Shorta on 7 May.

In January 2014, Jebor switched clubs and countries again, after agreeing to a six-month loan deal with Al-Ahli Tripoli SC. On 5 August he signed a four-year contract with Portuguese side Rio Ave FC.

Jebor made his Primeira Liga debut on 13 September 2014, coming on as a second-half substitute for Renan Bressan in a 1–1 draw at Moreirense FC. He scored his first goal for the club on 30 April of the following year, netting his team's only in a 1–1 Taça de Portugal home draw against SC Braga.

On 28 July 2015, Jebor was loaned to SD Ponferradina in Spanish Segunda División, in a season-long deal.

In January 2023 Jebor signed a contract until the end of the season with Maltese Premier League side Valletta.

International career
Jebor made his debut for Liberia on 26 March 2011, starting in a 4–2 loss against Cape Verde. His first international goal came on 14 June 2015, in a 2–1 defeat at Togo.

On 13 October 2015, Jebor scored a hat-trick in a 3–1 win at Guinea-Bissau, after scoring another one in the first leg. And he also scored another hat-trick against Djibouti in the African Cup of Nations Qualifier. On 29 March 2016, he scored another hat-trick in a CAF 2017 qualification match in Monrovia, Liberia, between Djibouti and Liberia, becoming the only Liberian senior national football team player to score a hat-trick more than once in an international tournament.

Career statistics

Scores and results list Liberia's goal tally first, score column indicates score after each Jebor goal.

Honors
Wydad Casablanca
 Botola top scorer: Moroccan League 2016–2017

References

External links

1991 births
Living people
Sportspeople from Monrovia
Liberian footballers
Association football forwards
Liberia international footballers
Primeira Liga players
Segunda División players
Botola players
Saudi Professional League players
UAE Pro League players
Syrian Premier League players
Libyan Premier League players
Meistriliiga players
Rio Ave F.C. players
SD Ponferradina players
Wydad AC players
Al Nassr FC players
Taliya SC players
Tersana SC players
Eastern Company SC players
Al-Ahli SC (Tripoli) players
Fujairah FC players
Nõmme Kalju FC players
Valletta F.C. players
Liberian expatriate footballers
Liberian expatriate sportspeople in Syria
Expatriate footballers in Syria
Liberian expatriate sportspeople in Egypt
Expatriate footballers in Egypt
Liberian expatriate sportspeople in Libya
Expatriate footballers in Libya
Liberian expatriate sportspeople in Portugal
Expatriate footballers in Portugal
Liberian expatriate sportspeople in Spain
Expatriate footballers in Spain
Liberian expatriate sportspeople in Morocco
Expatriate footballers in Morocco
Liberian expatriate sportspeople in Saudi Arabia
Expatriate footballers in Saudi Arabia
Liberian expatriate sportspeople in the United Arab Emirates
Expatriate footballers in the United Arab Emirates
Expatriate footballers in Estonia
Liberian expatriate sportspeople in Estonia